Gypsonoma oppressana, the poplar bud-worm, is a moth of the family Tortricidae. It is found on Madeira and in central and southern Europe, from Transcaucasia to Kazakhstan and Tajikistan.

The wingspan is 12–15 mm. Adults are on wing in June and July.

The larvae feed on Populus nigra, Populus alba and Populus tremula and is considered a minor pest on these species. Young larvae feed on the underside of the leaf in an angle of the veins, living beneath a silken web and eating the surface of the leaf. Later they feed in the buds, moving from bud to bud.

References

External links
Eurasian Tortricidae

Moths described in 1835
Eucosmini
Moths of Japan
Moths of Europe